The Spanish House is a 1938 novel by the British writer Eleanor Smith.

References

Bibliography
 Vinson, James. Twentieth-Century Romance and Gothic Writers. Macmillan, 1982.

1938 British novels
Novels by Lady Eleanor Smith
British romance novels
Hutchinson (publisher) books